Colonel Moutarde (born 1968 in Saint-Nazaire, France) is a visual artist, popularly known for her comic books and work in the advertising industry.

External links
 Official website 
 Colonel Moutarde biography on Lambiek Comiclopedia

People from Saint-Nazaire
French comics artists
French female comics artists
French illustrators
1968 births
Living people